Robert Ramsay Wright (23 September 1852 – 6 September 1933) was a Scottish zoologist and academic whose professional career was spent in Canada.

Born in a manse at Alloa, Clackmannanshire, he studied at Edinburgh High School before receiving a B.Sc. and M.A from the University of Edinburgh.

In 1874, he was appointed a Professor of Natural History at the University of Toronto where he would remain until he retired in 1912. In 1887, he was appointed the first Professor of Biology at the University of Toronto. He was also instrumental in re-establishing the medical school at University of Toronto in 1887. In 1901, he became the first Dean of Arts and in 1902 was appointed a Vice-President of the University.

In 1889 his textbook An introduction to zoology: for the use of high schools was published by The Copp, Clark Company in Toronto.

References

External links
 Robert Ramsay Wright at The Canadian Encyclopedia
Robert Ramsay Wright archival papers held at the University of Toronto Archives and Records Management Services

1852 births
1933 deaths
Alumni of the University of Edinburgh
Canadian university and college faculty deans
Canadian university and college vice-presidents
Scottish zoologists
Academic staff of the University of Toronto
People educated at the Royal High School, Edinburgh
Scottish emigrants to Canada
People from Alloa
Fellows of the Royal Society of Canada